Sai Ying Pun  is one of the 15 constituencies in the Central and Western District.

The constituency returns one district councillor to the Central and Western District Council, with an election every four years.

Sai Ying Pun constituency is loosely based on the northern part of Sai Ying Pun with estimated population of 14,815.

Councillors represented

Election results

2010s

2000s

1990s

1980s

Citations

References
2011 District Council Election Results (Central & Western)
2007 District Council Election Results (Central & Western)
2003 District Council Election Results (Central & Western)
1999 District Council Election Results (Central & Western)

Constituencies of Hong Kong
Constituencies of Central and Western District Council
Constituencies established in 1982
1982 establishments in Hong Kong
Constituencies disestablished in 1985
1985 disestablishments in Hong Kong
Constituencies established in 1994
1994 establishments in Hong Kong
Sai Ying Pun